The Wordsmith is a 1979 Canadian television film directed by Claude Jutra. Based on a screenplay by Mordecai Richler, the film stars Saul Rubinek as Mervyn Kaplansky, a writer in Montreal who aspires to sell his debut novel while navigating his relationships with his landlords Mr. and Mrs. Hersh (Peter Boretski and Janet Ward) and his love interest Molly (Sherry Lewis).

The film received six Genie Award nominations in the Non-Feature Film categories at the 1st Genie Awards in 1980, for Outstanding TV Drama Over 30 Minutes, Best Actor in a Non-Feature (Rubinek), Best Actress in a Non-Feature (Ward), Best Art Direction (Milton Parcher), Best Screenplay (Richler) and Best Editing (Arla Saare). It won the awards for Best Art Direction and Best Screenplay.

References

External links

1979 television films
Films directed by Claude Jutra
CBC Television original films
Canadian drama television films
Films based on works by Mordecai Richler
Jewish Canadian films
English-language Canadian films
1970s English-language films
1970s Canadian films